Nepean Creek Park is a linear watershed park, in Ottawa, Ontario, Canada.  It is part of the Greenbelt master plan of the National Capital Commission.

It runs East-West along North Colonnade Road for more than a kilometre.

The park is located about two kilometres South of Hog's Back Falls.

Features
It offers many soccer fields, and a long bike path, but it is mostly a nature preserve filled with wild animals and vegetation.  Ducks often winter in its ponds instead of heading South.  The creek empties itself near the eastern end of the park by crossing under Prince of Wales Drive and entering the Rideau River.

Parks in Ottawa